The Golden Mile is a commercial district in the Scarborough district of Toronto, Ontario, Canada. Situated along Eglinton Avenue East, east of Victoria Park Avenue, it was one of Canada's first model industrial parks. The original Golden Mile of Industry ran along Eglinton from Pharmacy Avenue east to Birchmount Road.

The area was farmland prior to World War II with settlement by Scottish immigrants beginning in the 1820s (notably by the likes of the McCowans and Thompsons) and prior to settlements by Europeans in the late 18th century was mostly covered by forests.

History

In the 1940s,  was acquired by the Government of Canada to build munitions plants for Canada's involvement in World War II. In 1941 General Engineering Company of Ontario (GECO) a massive munitions plant was constructed covering the area southeast of Eglinton and Warden. The facility was located in the area, which was then far from the city, to protect against accidental detonations. At its peak, 5,300 people worked at the plant and 256,567,485 munitions were produced over the course of the war. Following the war, under the leadership of Scarborough reeve, Oliver E. Crockford, the area and 14 buildings were purchased from the Government of Canada by the Township of Scarborough. The township built municipal offices and a library along Eglinton and sold the rest to private industry to develop the area as "The Golden Mile", patterned after the Golden Mile in London, England. In the 1950s and 1960s, numerous factories producing mostly consumer goods operated along the Golden Mile including a 34 hectare General Motors van assembly plant.

Further west, retail uses developed, including the Golden Mile Plaza and the Eglinton Square Shopping Centre. Surrounding the industrial area, suburban residential development was built. Due to the success of the Golden mile, further east along Eglinton between Birchmount and Kennedy, the Ionview neighborhood was developed, with a large amount of apartment buildings fronting Eglinton, making it a compact apartment neighbourhood.

Today, little industrial uses exist on Eglinton Avenue, while some industrial uses remain off Eglinton on side streets. Around the year 2000, the south section of Eglinton development of the former van plant property was being redeveloped into a new trend at the time American style "big box" retail uses.

In 2014, the City of Toronto government and Metrolinx conducted a preplanning exercise called Eglinton Connects to create walkable, mixed-use developments along the Eglinton Crosstown LRT. One area for such development is the Golden Mile site between Victoria Park Avenue and Pharmacy Avenue, which will be served by two LRT stops. City planning officials said that, although there is weak demand for new condos in central Scarborough, the LRT is stimulating demand for development.

Economy

List of businesses

The Golden Mile is home to a number of shopping malls and plazas, including:

 Eglinton Corners
 Eglinton Square Shopping Centre
 Eglinton Town Centre
 Smart Centres Scarborough West
 RioCan Scarborough Centre

Golden Mile Mall
Golden Mile Plaza was added west of the industrial "mile" in 1954 and was visited in 1959 by Queen Elizabeth II marking the further transformation of the area into a series of strip malls.

The original strip mall on the north of Eglinton Avenue was anchored by a Famous Players movie theatre located at Pharmacy Avenue and Eglinton.  The west section of the strip was severely damaged by a fire in 1986, which hastened the beginning of the transformation of the area into one of Toronto's largest concentrations of power centres and big-box stores.

The plaza was replaced with the first Loblaws branded Super Store within Toronto and a few other retail stores. Its building was not a mall and was not comparable to the variety of retail stores and services it replaced. Other stores that were originally part of the strange design of the building were a Fabricland and a Zellers, which closed in the 2000s. The superstore was rebranded as a No Frills, and much later Toronto Employment and Social Services, popular retailer Joe Fresh (part of Loblaws), Fit 4 Less, and a dollar store became tenants in 2010, using space that Zellers and Fabricland had previously occupied.

In 2017, the property owner Choice Properties REIT announced a redevelopment of the 19-acre site into a mixed-use, transit-oriented development. It will include a mix of buildings of various heights and a new Loblaws supermarket. The development will create new streets surrounding nine city blocks and include a public park and a public square. The first phase will entail the construction of the new supermarket, the demolition of the existing mall, and the construction of new streets through the project. This redevelopment is still in the proposal state, along with all other proposed redevelopment pending completion of the Golden Mile Secondary Plan Study.

Institutions

The Golden Mile is home to several services operated by the City of Toronto government, including the Toronto Public Library, whose Eglinton Square branch is located in the neighbourhood. The Government of Canada also operates several institutions in the neighbourhood, including a provincial courthouse, as well as the Toronto East Detention Centre. The Toronto East Detention Centre is a remand centre operated by the Ministry of Community Safety and Correctional Services.

References

External links
Not much remains of Scarborough's Golden Mile  - Globe and Mail
Thesis: Intensifying Toronto - Golden Mile and Future Urban Growth
Secondary Plan - City Of Toronto

Neighbourhoods in Toronto
Scarborough, Toronto